The large mosaic-tailed rat (Mammelomys rattoides) is a species of rodent in the family Muridae.
It is found in West Papua, Indonesia and Papua New Guinea.

References

Mammelomys
Mammals of Western New Guinea
Rodents of Papua New Guinea
Mammals described in 1922
Taxa named by Oldfield Thomas
Taxonomy articles created by Polbot
Rodents of New Guinea